This is a timeline of incidents in 1971 that have been labelled as "terrorism" and are not believed to have been carried out by a government or its forces (see state terrorism and state-sponsored terrorism).

Guidelines 
To be included, entries must be notable (have a stand-alone article) and described by a consensus of reliable sources as "terrorism".
List entries must comply with the guidelines outlined in the manual of style under MOS:TERRORIST.
Casualties figures in this list are the total casualties of the incident including immediate casualties and later casualties (such as people who succumbed to their wounds long after the attacks occurred).
Casualties listed are the victims. Perpetrator casualties are listed separately (e.g. x (+y) indicate that x victims and y perpetrators were killed/injured).
Casualty totals may be underestimated or unavailable due to a lack of information. A figure with a plus (+) sign indicates that at least that many people have died (e.g. 10+ indicates that at least 10 people have died) – the actual toll could be considerably higher. A figure with a plus (+) sign may also indicate that over that number of people are victims.
If casualty figures are 20 or more, they will be shown in bold. In addition, figures for casualties more than 50 will also be underlined.
Incidents are limited to one per location per day. If multiple attacks occur in the same place on the same day, they will be merged into a single incident.
In addition to the guidelines above, the table also includes the following categories:

List

See also
List of terrorist incidents

References

 1971
 
 1971
 1971
Terr